The Palmetto is a passenger train operated by Amtrak on a  route between New York City and Savannah, Georgia, via the Northeast Corridor, Washington, D.C., Richmond, Virginia, Fayetteville, North Carolina, and Charleston, South Carolina. The Palmetto is a shorter version of the Silver Meteor, which continues south to Miami, Florida. Between 1996 and 2002 this service was called the Silver Palm. Although currently a day train, in the past the Palmetto provided overnight sleeper service to Florida.

During fiscal year 2019, the Palmetto carried 345,342 passengers, a decrease of 11% from FY2018. The train had a total revenue of $27,208,372 during FY2016, a 61.4% increase over FY2015.

History

The "Palmetto" name was first used by the Atlantic Coast Line Railroad in 1909 for the Palmetto Limited, which ran from New York City to Augusta and Savannah, Georgia, with a connection to Atlanta via the Georgia Railroad.  The ACL train was discontinued in 1968.

Amtrak introduced the new Palmetto on June 15, 1976. The train drew its name from the Sabal palmetto, the state tree of South Carolina.  The Palmetto was the first train in the Southern United States to receive the then-new Amfleet equipment, and the  run was the longest at the time for the new coaches. At the time of introduction, Amtrak planned to run the Palmetto daily for the summer only, with service ending September 8. However, citing better-than-expected ridership, Amtrak extended the Palmetto to a year-round service indefinitely. In October 1976 the Florida Department of Transportation urged Amtrak to extend the Palmetto south to Miami.

In October 1984, Amtrak began operating operated the Carolinian, a North Carolina-focused regional train, as a section of the Palmetto. The two trains ran combined between New York and Richmond, Virginia. At Richmond the Carolinian continued separately to Raleigh and Charlotte, North Carolina. The Carolinian was discontinued in September 1985, after the state of North Carolina refused to increase its support for the train, and then revived in 1990.

In December 1988 Amtrak extended the Palmetto south to Jacksonville, Florida. The train continued to be coach-only, without full dining service. Beginning on May 12, 1990, the Palmetto combined with a revived Carolinian, although this time the split occurred in Rocky Mount, North Carolina. The two trains began running independently to New York in April 1991. In October 1994 the Palmetto became a full overnight with sleeper and dining car service, running through to Tampa, Florida. This replaced the Silver Meteor's Tampa section. This extension was short-lived: budget cuts under the Clinton administration led to the Palmetto's discontinuance on February 1, 1995.

Revival 

Amtrak added a third train from New York to Miami on November 10, 1996, known as the Silver Palm in line with the Silver Service brand for Amtrak's Florida trains. However, it used the same route as the former Palmetto and carried the same numbers (89 southbound and 90 northbound). While the Silver Star and Silver Meteor ran straight from Jacksonville to Miami, at Jacksonville the Silver Palm turned west and continued over the old Seaboard Air Line Railroad main line via Waldo, Ocala, Wildwood and Dade City to Tampa. At Tampa, it reversed and ran south to Miami. Amtrak restored the Palmetto name on May 1, 2002, after it removed the sleepers and dining car from the train, although it continued serving Florida.

On November 1, 2004, Amtrak truncated the Palmetto to Savannah, Georgia, operating a daytime schedule to and from New York (as it had prior to 1994). With the truncation to Savannah, the Silver Star was rerouted to serve Tampa; the old Jacksonville-Lakeland route is now served by a Thruway Motorcoach bus transfer from the Silver Star, which serves all the former stations as well as Gainesville.

In the January 2011 issue of Trains magazine, this route was listed as one of five routes to be looked at by Amtrak in FY 2011 as the previous five routes (Sunset, Eagle, Zephyr, Capitol, and Cardinal) were examined in FY 2010. In October 2015, in an effort to reduce redundant trains, Amtrak temporarily cancelled one daily Northeast Regional round trip and allowed the Palmetto to take local passengers north of Washington.

On April 3, 2016, the southbound Palmetto struck a backhoe while travelling through Chester, Pennsylvania, killing two track workers and derailing the locomotive, as well as damaging the first two cars of the train.

Operation

Equipment 

Most Palmetto trains consist of six cars hauled by a locomotive.

The passenger cars are from the Amfleet series. Most trains include an Amfleet club car which has a combination of Business Class seating with a Café (food service/lounge) and four Coach Class cars. The train also carries a Viewliner series baggage car for checked baggage service. Unlike most Amtrak long-distance trains, the Palmetto does not carry sleeping cars or a dining car, which were removed from the train in 2002.

Between New York and Washington, the service operates over the Northeast Corridor which has overhead electric wires and trains are pulled by Siemens ACS-64 electric locomotives at speeds up to 

In the coming years all equipment will be replaced with Amtrak Airo trainsets, the railroad's branding of its combination of Siemens Venture passenger cars and a Siemens Charger diesel-electric locomotive. The trainsets for the Palmetto will have six passenger cars, which will include a food service area and a mix of 2x2 Coach Class and 2x1 Business Class seating. The car closest to the locomotive will be a specialized "Auxiliary Power Vehicle" which will include a pantograph to collect power from overhead lines and will feed it to four traction motors in the car, and via a DC link cable, to the four traction motors in the locomotive. The arrangement will offer a near seamless transition between power sources at Washington, a process that currently requires a time-consuming locomotive change.

Classes of service 
All classes of service include complimentary WiFi, an electric outlet (120 V, 60 Hz AC) at each seat, reading lamps, fold-out tray tables. Reservations are required on all trains, tickets may be purchased online, from an agent at some stations, a ticketing machine at most stations, or, at a higher cost, from the conductor on the train.
Coach Class: 2x2 seating. Passengers self-select seats on a first-come, first-served basis.
Business Class: 2x1 seating with more legroom than coach. Passengers receive complimentary soft drinks. Seats assigned in advance.

Route 
 
The Palmetto's route has not changed significantly since it first ran in 1976. It parallels the Florida-bound Silver Meteor, making additional station stops. When introduced in 1976 it included two new stations:  and Kingstree, South Carolina.  Kingstree sees the Silver Meteor as well. The Palmetto added Selma, North Carolina (Smithfield) in October 1982. In October 2015, it added New Carrollton, BWI Airport, Princeton Junction, New Brunswick and Metropark.

The Palmetto operates over Amtrak and CSX Transportation trackage:
 New York – Washington D.C. (Amtrak)
 Northeast Corridor
 Washington D.C. – Savannah, GA (CSXT)
 RF&P Subdivision
 Richmond Terminal Subdivision
 North End Subdivision
 South End Subdivision
 Charleston Subdivision
 Savannah Subdivision

Bus connections 
Amtrak Thruway bus routes began operating in eastern North Carolina in October 2012 that connect to the northbound and southbound Palmetto at the Wilson, North Carolina station. One route serves  Greenville, New Bern, Havelock, and Morehead City; the other route serves Goldsboro, Kinston, Jacksonville, and Wilmington.

Station stops
Unlike other long-distance trains, the Palmetto makes local stops along the Northeast Corridor as well as major city stops. It stops at Metropark and BWI Airport in both directions, and serves New Brunswick and Princeton Junction southbound and New Carrollton northbound.

Before 2019, the southbound Palmetto followed the practice of most medium- and long-distance trains running in the Northeast, and did not allow passengers to travel only between stations in the Northeast Corridor. It only stopped to receive passengers between Newark and Washington. This policy was intended to keep seats available for passengers making longer trips. Starting in 2019, the southbound Palmetto began allowing local travel along the Northeast Corridor. The northbound Palmetto has allowed such local travel since 2015.

References

Notes

External links

Amtrak routes
Railway services introduced in 1976
Passenger rail transportation in New York (state)
Passenger rail transportation in New Jersey
Passenger rail transportation in Pennsylvania
Passenger rail transportation in Delaware
Passenger rail transportation in Maryland
Passenger rail transportation in Washington, D.C.
Passenger rail transportation in Virginia
Passenger rail transportation in North Carolina
Passenger rail transportation in South Carolina
Passenger rail transportation in Georgia (U.S. state)
Long distance Amtrak routes